Millennium Tower may refer to:

 Millennium Tower (Abuja), Nigeria
 Millennium Tower (Amsterdam), Netherlands
 Millennium Tower (Belgrade), Serbia
 Millennium Tower (Boston), United States
 Millennium Tower (Dubai), United Arab Emirates
 Millennium Tower (Frankfurt), Germany
 Millennium Tower (Gedinne), Belgium
 Millennium Tower (London), England
 Millennium Tower (Magdeburg), Germany (Jahrtausendturm)
 Millennium Tower (New York City), United States
 Millennium Tower (Penang), Malaysia
 Millennium Tower (Rotterdam), Netherlands
 Millennium Tower (San Francisco), United States
 Millennium Tower (Tokyo), Japan
 Millennium Tower (Vienna), Austria

See also
 Millennium Point (disambiguation)